City Route 85 is a solo EP by John K. Samson of The Weakerthans, released October 30, 2009 on Grand Hotel van Cleef in Europe, and November 3, 2009 on ANTI-/Epitaph in North America. Samson's first solo release since the EP Little Pictures in 1995, it was the first in a planned series of three or four-song singles inspired by roads in his home province of Manitoba.

Winnipeg's Route 85 is also known by the street name Portage Avenue.

The tracks were later re-recorded and released, along with those on Provincial Road 222, on Samson's solo album Provincial.

Track listing
 "Heart of the Continent"
 "Grace General"
 "Cruise Night"

References

2009 EPs
John K. Samson albums
Anti- (record label) albums
Epitaph Records EPs